The 1989 New York City Marathon was the 20th running of the annual marathon race in New York City, United States, which took place on Sunday, November 5. The men's elite race was won by Tanzania's Juma Ikangaa in a time of 2:08:01 hours while the women's race was won by Norway's Ingrid Kristiansen in 2:25:30.

A total of 24,659 runners finished the race, 19,971 men and 4688 women.

Results

Men

Women

References

Results
Results. Association of Road Racing Statisticians. Retrieved 2020-05-24.

External links
New York Road Runners website

1989
New York City
Marathon
New York City Marathon